Eva Avila (born Eva Gougeon-Ávila on 25 February 1987) is a Canadian singer, songwriter and actress. She won the fourth season of the CTV reality show Canadian Idol in 2006.

Early life 
Avila was born in Gatineau, Quebec. Her father introduced her to music. She has been singing in public since age 2, and at age 9 was a winner on Homegrown Cafe, a talent show on CJOH-TV in Ottawa. Prior to Idol, she worked as a postal clerk and a beauty consultant. She is a former winner of the Jeune Diva du Québec contest. Avila also participated in another competition for a Quebec TV téléroman aired on Radio-Canada called Virginie.

She usually speaks English and French

Her nickname, given by her family when she was a small child, is still Eva le dragon (Eva the dragon).

Music career

2006: Canadian Idol 
In early 2006, Avila auditioned for the fourth season of Canadian Idol in Ottawa. She advanced into the top 10, and then she made it to the final two of the competition. During the final show, hundreds of Avila's supporters were gathered at Gatineau City Hall while Canadian Idol crews were filming scenes occasionally during the show. Several local politicians such as Gatineau mayor Marc Bureau, Hull—Aylmer federal MP Marcel Proulx, as well as Hull provincial MNA Roch Cholette were in attendance. During the finale show, Judge Zack Werner said that Avila was the show's most obvious candidate for international stardom, but he thought Craig Sharpe would win the competition. However, on 16 September 2006, Eva Avila was crowned as the fourth Canadian Idol winner, defeating Craig Sharpe by a margin of only 131,000 votes or 3%. To date, she is one of only five singers from Quebec or Francophone Canada to crack the top ten and the first to win the event: Season one's Audrey de Montigny was the first to reach the top ten, Steffi DiDomenicantonio in season four, Khalila Glanville in season five and Katherine St-Laurent in season six.

Canadian Idol performances

2006–07: Somewhere Else 
Hours after her victory, Avila signed with the Sony BMG Canada record label and released her first single "Meant to Fly", which debuted at number one on the Canadian singles chart, a position it held for a huge nine weeks. The single was eventually certified double platinum. On 5 October 2006, the CTV television network reported that Avila has signed a modelling contract with Ford Model. Avila started the 2006 NHL season on 4 October when she performed the Canadian national anthem at the Toronto Maple Leafs vs. Ottawa Senators game. She performed the anthem again before another Battle of Ontario game at the Scotiabank Place on 26 October following an autograph session on the same afternoon at Gatineau's Les Galeries de Hull shopping centre.

Avila's debut album, Somewhere Else, was released on 14 November 2006, and debuted at number 6 on the Canadian albums chart, selling 16,000 copies in its first week.  The second single from the album, "I Owe It All to You", peaked at number nine. On 19 November 2006, Avila performed the national anthem at the 94th Grey Cup game in Winnipeg. Eva and her Canadian Idol predecessor, Melissa O'Neil, were both nominated for the 2007 Juno Award for Best New Artist, but Tomi Swick won the award. The third and final single from Avila's album, "Fallin' for You" was released in April 2007 and peaked at number thirty-five.

2008–10: Give Me the Music 
On 26 March 2007, eTalk confirmed that Avila would be the new face of Maybelline New York, making her the first Canadian to be a face for the brand. Also in 2007, she participated on the hip hop compilation Les 40 Voleurs with La Dynastie on the song "La Fausse Raison". Eva also recorded the song "Canada (You're a Lifetime Journey)," the finale tune to the film O Canada!, which was shown at the Canadian pavilion in Epcot in Orlando, Florida from 2007 through 2019.

Following the success of her debut album, Avila returned to the recording studio in Toronto to begin work on her second album. On 9 August 2008, she announced on Canada's eTalk that the first single to be taken from her second album would be called "Give Me The Music", composed by Matrax Production and written by Frankie Storm, Tee Marie a.k.a. Tanya Miller of (Tha Kopi Writz) and Shaun Johnson and would be released on 2 September, with the album of the same name following on 28 October. She also stated that the record label, Sony BMG Canada were hoping to make the record her first American release. If the album was released and well received in America, Avila stated that she hoped to extend the album's supportive tour into the U.S. When released in Canada on 28 October, Eva's second album, Give Me the Music, hit the national albums chart at number 63, a surprisingly low debut considering the lead single had peaked at number 21 on the Canadian Hot 100. "Damned", the second single from the album debuted on the Hot 100 in January 2009 and peaked at number 83. In late March 2009, Avila was the support act for the four Canadian dates of Beyoncé Knowles' I Am... World Tour. She recently performed at the Virgin Festival 2009 in Montreal. She was the third act. She also performed at the 2010 Winter Olympics closing ceremony on 28 February 2010.

2011 
Eva Avila sang the National Anthem and performed at the halftime show at the Montreal Alouettes' home opener on 29 June 2011. She sang three songs, including "I Owe It All to You".

2013–present: Never Get Enough 
On 15 October 2013, Avila released "Bitter Meets Sweet", the first single from her EP Never Get Enough, released on 5 May 2015.

In 2015, Avila recorded "Unidos Somos Mas", the Spanish language version of the theme song for the 2015 Pan American Games. It was one of three versions of the song, alongside Serena Ryder's English-language "Together We Are One" and Jasmine Denham's French "Ensemble on est immense".

Avila is currently a singer in the Pink Floyd tribute band Brit Floyd.

She has also had occasional television and film acting roles, most notably as Tania in the 2022 drama film Coyote.

Personal life 
Eva Avila married Brit Floyd bandmate and guitarist Edo Scordo in May 2020.

Discography 

The following is a complete discography of every album and single released by Avila.

Albums

Singles

Promotional singles 
 "The Little Drummer Boy" (2012)

Other recordings 
 "Canada (You're a Lifetime Journey)" (from Epcot's O Canada film at Walt Disney World)

Appeared on 
 Canadian Idol: Spotlights (August 2006)

Tours 
2007: Somewhere Else Tour2009: I Am... World Tour (support act)

Controversies 
Cholette and Proulx, two politicians who appeared at the Canadian Idol final, published a full page newspaper ad to ask local residents to vote for Avila. This drew criticism from local residents, who claimed it was a waste of taxpayers' money. It was later ruled that the two politicians had to pay the costs.

Avila's name was mentioned in the Outaouais Parti Québécois 2007 election platform recognizing local culture, including Avila and Pierre Lapointe. After complaints from her record company, Sony BMG, the party decided to remove her name.

See also 

 Canadian rock
 Music of Canada

References

External links 
 Eva Avila – official website
 

1987 births
Living people
Musicians from Gatineau
Actresses from Quebec
Quebecers of French descent
Canadian people of Peruvian descent
Canadian women pop singers
Canadian Idol winners
Spanish-language singers of Canada
21st-century Canadian women singers
Canadian film actresses
Canadian television actresses